Robert Murray (born in Belfast, Northern Ireland) was an Irish soccer player during the 1890s.

Murray was a fullback who captained for the Bohemians F.C. from 1893 to 1898. He earned a runner-up medal in 1895, as Bohemians were beaten by Linfield in the Irish Cup finals. He was more successful in the Leinster Senior Cup, as he picked up four first-place medals from 1894 to 1897. Murray also worked as a doctor.

Murray played alongside his brother, John Murray, who also practiced medicine.

Robert Murray died in 1906.

Honours
Leinster Senior Cup: 4
 Bohemians - 1894, 1895, 1896, 1897

References

1906 deaths
Irish association footballers (before 1923)
Bohemian F.C. players
Year of birth missing

Association football fullbacks